A flyby is a spaceflight operation in which a spacecraft passes in proximity to another body, usually a target of its space exploration mission and/or a source of a gravity assist to impel it towards another target. Spacecraft which are specifically designed for this purpose are known as flyby spacecraft, although the term has also been used in regard to asteroid flybys of Earth for example. Important parameters are the time and distance of closest approach.

Spacecraft flyby

Flyby maneuvers can be conducted with a planet, a natural satellite or a non-planetary object such as a small Solar System body.

Planetary flybys have occurred with Mars or Earth for example:
List of Earth flybys
Mars flyby

Another application of the flyby is of Earth's Moon, usually called a lunar flyby. The Apollo 13 spacecraft had an exploded oxygen tank, and therefore had to flyby around the Moon. The Artemis 2 and #dearMoon project will include a lunar flyby.

Mars

In regards to Mars flybys, a related concept is a Mars flyby rendezvous, where a spacecraft does not enter orbit but rendezvous before or after a flyby of the planet with another spacecraft. Mars flyby rendezvous was evaluated at NASA's Manned Spacecraft Center in the 1960s. At that time NASA developed designs for a combination of a Mars lander, short-stay surface habitat, and ascent vehicle called a Mars Excursion Module (MEM); the ascent stage performed the rendezvous with a different spacecraft that did a flyby of Mars without entering orbit or landing. Compared to MOR, a flyby rendezvous means one spacecraft does not have to orbit Mars, so the resources needed on a return journey to Earth are not taken in and out of Mars orbit for example.  (See also Mars cycler)

Mariner IV flyby of Mars in July 1965 returned more accurate atmospheric data about Mars and much closer views of its surface then previously. 

Mariner 6 and Mariner 7 flyby of Mars in 1969 caused another breakthrough in knowledge about the planet. The Mariner 6 & 7 infrared radiometer results from he flyby showed that the atmosphere of Mars was composed mostly of carbon dioxide (CO2), and they were also able to detect trace amounts water on the surface of Mars.

In 2018, the twin Mars Cube One performed a flyby to relay communication for InSight lander EDL (they were launched towards Mars with the cruise stage carrying the InSight lander). Both MarCOs reached Mars and successfully relayed data during the Entry, Descent, and Landing phase of Insight on November 26, 2018.

Meanwhile, Tianwen-1 Deployable Camera, imaged Tianwen-1 in on its transit to Mars, in September 2020 and made a flyby of Mars around 10 February, 2021 according to its trajectory thought for Mars, before entering the deep space or a solar orbit.

Kuiper belt

The New Horizons spacecraft was planning to fly by the Kuiper belt object 486958 Arrokoth on New Year's Day 2019, after its successful flyby of the dwarf planet Pluto in 2015.

On the night of December 31, 2018 to the morning of January 1, 2019 New Horizons performed the most distant flyby to date, of the Kuiper belt object Arrokoth. New Horizons previously did a flyby of Pluto in July 2015, and that was at about 32.9 AU (astronomical units) from the Sun, while the New Year's Day 2019 flyby of the Kuiper object Arrokoth was at 43.6 AU.

Cassini

Cassini-Huygens (launched 1997), which orbited Saturn (from 2004-2017) performed flybys of many of Saturn's moons including Titan. Cassini-Huygens had its first flyby of Titan in October 2004. For further examples of Cassini flybys of Saturn's moons see Timeline of Cassini-Huygens.

Cassini conducted many flybys at various distances of the moons of Saturn. It achieved 126 flybys of Titan, and its final close flyby was on April 22, 2017 prior to its retirement.

An animation of the Cassini spacecraft trajectory around Saturn over 10 years, during which it passed closely by many moons of Saturn, is at right.

Comets

In 2010, the Deep Impact spacecraft, on the EPOXI mission did a flyby of comet Hartley 2.

Natural flyby

Flyby is also sometimes loosely used to describe when, for example, an asteroid approaches and coasts by the Earth.

This was also the term for when a comet did a flyby of Mars in 2014.

On December 16, 2018 the short period comet 46P/Wirtanen had its closest approach of Earth, coming within   (one of its closest approaches to Earth).

See also
Aerobraking
Aerogravity assist
Apsis
Deliberate crash landings on extraterrestrial bodies ('fly-in')
Flight dynamics (spacecraft)
List of asteroid close approaches to Earth
Orbital spaceflight
Space rendezvous

References

External links
Smithsonian Air and Space- Probes and Fly-by Spacecraft
Lunar flybys

Spaceflight concepts